Gun Hill is a hamlet in the civil parish of Chiddingly in the Wealden district of East Sussex, England. It is one of the seven hills of the parish in which it stands. The hamlet is where Wealden and Wealdway cheeses are produced.

References

External links
 Photos of Gun Hill – Geograph.org.uk

Villages in East Sussex
Chiddingly